Flightline Flight 101 was an international flight from Barcelona, Spain to Oran, Algeria. It crashed into the sea, probably due to a lightning strike leading to a loss of electricity.

Aircraft and crew 
EC-GDV was a Swearingen SA226-AT Merlin IVA Metroliner built in 1976. Prior to the accident it had accumulated 11,950 flight hours. It was powered by two TPE331-10UA engines. It was not equipped with a cockpit voice recorder nor a flight data recorder, and was not required to.

The captain and first officer, aged 33 and 43, respectively, were both Spanish nationals. Their total amount of flight experience is unknown.

Flight 
The aircraft took off from Barcelona-El Prat Airport at 10:18. It flew normally in the direction of Valencia before the last radio contact at 10:38 and disappeared from radar screens 4 minutes later, probably as a result of total electrical failure, caused by a lightning strike. The loss of electricity rendered many systems inoperable, such as elevator trim, lighting and instruments, anti-ice and navigation. The aircraft then impacted the water at a steep pitch angle, either as a result of loss of control or spatial disorientation.

Cause

Investigators noted two instances where an electrical failure occurred on board an SA-226 due to a lightning strike. On February 8, 1988, Nürnberger Flugdienst Flight 108 broke up in mid-air after the pilots became disoriented due to a loss of electrical power caused by a lightning strike. Later in November 1991, another aircraft suffered a lightning strike and a total electrical failure. However the crew managed to restore power and land safely.

Considering this and the loss of radar contact, investigators concluded that the cause of the accident could not be determined, but stated that a likely scenario was:
<ref name="report"<ref name="asn"<ref name="baaa"

See also 
 Nürnberger Flugdienst Flight 108
 Pan Am Flight 214

References 

Airliner accidents and incidents caused by lightning strikes
Aviation accidents and incidents in Spain
Aviation accidents and incidents in 2001
2001 in Spain
Airliner accidents and incidents with an unknown cause
Accidents and incidents involving the Fairchild Swearingen Metroliner
October 2001 events in Europe